Flat Creek Township is an inactive township in Pettis County, in the U.S. state of Missouri.

Flat Creek Township was erected in 1846, taking its name from Flat Creek.

References

Townships in Missouri
Townships in Pettis County, Missouri